Kalehe Territory is a territory in South Kivu, Democratic Republic of the Congo. Its administrative centre is the town of Kalehe on the western shore of Lake Kivu. Other important towns include Buguli, Bunyakiri, Kalangala, Kalungu, Minova, and Nyamasasa.

Geography
Kalehe Territory is located in the far eastern Congo on the western shores of Lake Kivu. The eastern part of Kahuzi-Biéga National Park is located in Kalehe Territory.

Kalehe Territory borders the country of Rwanda to the east, across Lake Kivu. It borders the province of North Kivu (the territories of Walikale and Masisi) in the north; and the territories of Shabunda in the west, Kabare in the south, and Idjwi (an island in the middle of the Lake Kivu) also to the east.

Administrative divisions
Kalehe Territory is subdivided into two chiefdoms: Buloho and Buhavu.
The buhavu chiefdom which is located alongside lake Kivu, is the most populated place of Kalehe.Its populations are "Bantu" and their common language is "Kihavu".The Buhavu is led by a clan called "Bahande".This clan lead  majorly villages and urban centres of the chiefdom.
WE find in Ihusi, south part of Kalehe,the king's palace (mwami) called Kamirogosa.
Note that Nyangezi Mugugu is the father of the journalist Elvis Elisha Nyangezi of the Bubandano Radio in Minova.

See also
2002 Kalehe earthquake

References

Territories of South Kivu Province